This is a list of Mexican films released in 2016.

Box office records
 On May 30, ¿Qué Culpa Tiene el Niño?, starred by Karla Souza and Ricardo Abarca became the third highest-grossing film of all time in Mexico, only surpassed by No Se Aceptan Devoluciones and Nosotros Los Nobles (both 2013). The film grossed MXN$192 million in its first three weeks of release.

Films

See also
 List of 2016 box office number-one films in Mexico

References

External links

2016
Mexican
Film